The Commission on Dental Competency Assessments (formerly the North East Regional Board of Dental Examiners) is one of three examination agencies for dentists in the United States. These were organized to better standardize clinical exams for licensure. Historically each state had its own independent licensing exam.

On January 9, 2015, the NERB became the Commission on Dental Competency Assessments (CDCA).

August 3, 2021, CDCA, merged with WREB, the Western Regional Examining Board, creating CDCA-WREB. Then, on August 1, 2022, CDCA-WREB merged with The Council on Interstate Testing Agencies. 

Now CDCA-WREB-CITA, the organization administers the ADEX Dental and Dental Hygiene Exams. ADEX exams are administered and portable across the United States and beyond. The agency also administers the Florida Laws and Rules exam, and an Expanded Function Dental Assistant (EFDA) exam Sedation, Local Anesthesia, Dental Therapy and Nitrous Oxide examinations. 

CDCA-WREB-CITA has grown to include 47* states, Washington, DC, Puerto Rico, US Virgin Islands and Jamaica. The only states that still do not accept the ADEX exams for both Dental and Hygiene exams are: Delaware, Georgia, *Nebraska (accepts Dental but not Hygiene), *New York (accepts Hygiene but not Dental).

References

External links 
 http://www.cdcaexams.org

Dental examinations
Standardized tests in the United States